Annie Sophia Jane McIntosh, CBE, RRC, (21 April 1871 – 20 September 1951), nurse and nursing leader. She was a Matron of St Bartholomew's Hospital, London (1910-1927), she promoted the fledgling College of Nursing Ltd (now the Royal College of Nursing), and served on several war time committees.

Early life 
McIntosh was born on 21 April 1871 in Bromyard, Herefordshire. She was the fifth child of at least nine born to Donald McIntosh (1840-1909) and his wife Elizabeth née Lee (1840-1915). McIntosh’s father was a Draper who became a wholesale clothier and Justice of the Peace.

Nursing career 
Before McIntosh commenced nurse training at The London Hospital in March 1897, she worked as a governess and nursed at Borough Hospital, Birkenhead for two years. She was popular with both patients and staff was awarded 1st Prize in her final end of training examination. For the final six months of her training McIntosh worked working as an assistant sister in the matron’s office, where she worked for the rest of her career at The London Hospital. In 1905 she became Assistant Matron and later Chief Assistant Matron to Eva Luckes.

In June 1910 McIntosh was controversially appointed as matron of St Bartholomew’s Hospital. In 1913, during the ongoing debate about nurse registration, and the need for it, McIntosh was said to have banned a meeting to be held in the hospital to discuss the legalization of Nurse Registration for trained nurses. Ethel Gordon Fenwick - a former matron of St Bartholomew's Hospital - was a leading supporter for centralised state registration for nurses. However the House Committee, Treasurer and Almoner prevented the meeting as they did not wish to influence the decision of their staff. In 1916, McIntosh was co-opted onto the council of the newly formed College of Nursing Ltd. She was one of the first nurses recorded on the College of Nursing’s register and actively campaigned for legal registration for nurses. McIntosh worked for six years on the College of Nursing Council on both its provisional and elected councils. Probably to maintain neutrality amongst the various nursing bodies, McIntosh refused permission in 1927 for a meeting to be held at St Bartholomew’s Hospital which promoted Ethel Gordon Fenwick's British College of Nurses. During World War I, McIntosh was also Principal Matron of the First London General hospital, Camberwell.

She also served on a number of committees including:

 1916  - the War Office Committee for the Supply of Nurses
 The Advisory Board of Princess Mary’s Royal Air Force Nursing Service
 The Prison Commissioners Advisory Nursing Board
 The Joint V.A.D and United Services Committee
 Vice-Chairman of the Nurses Insurance Society
 The Royal National Pension Fund for Nurses Benevolent Committee 
 The Hospital Matron’s Association Executive
 Vice President of St Bartholomew's Hospital League of Nurses, 1923-1925
 President, St Bartholomew's Hospital League of Nurses, 1925-1927

Honours 
In 1917, McIntosh received the Royal Red Cross. She was awarded Commander of the British Empire for her "outstanding services at the hospital" in August 1917. In 1924, she was the recipient of the French Medaille d’Honneur (argent).

Personal life 
McIntosh retired in February 1927 because of exhaustion, initially living in Guildford. During the Second World War she lived in London where she interviewed auxiliary nursing candidates and packed parcels for prisoners of war. In 1945 McIntosh moved to Bexhill, East Sussex to be nearer her sisters. She had been disabled with arthritis for a while.

Death 
McIntosh died in Bexhill of pneumonia and osteoporosis on 20 September 1951. Her office papers and correspondence from 1910-1927 are held by Barts Health Archives and Museum.

References

Bibliography 
 Hector, Winifred (1973). Mrs Bedford Fenwick. London: Royal College of Nursing and National Council of Nurses of the United Kingdom.
 Lost Hospitals of London [Available at:  https://ezitis.myzen.co.uk, accessed on 13 August 2020].
 Rogers, Sarah (2020). "McIntosh, Annie Sophia Jane, (1871–1951)". Oxford Dictionary of National Biography (2020)
 Rogers, Sarah (2022). A Maker of Matrons’? A study of Eva Lückes's influence on a generation of nurse leaders:1880–1919 (Unpublished PhD thesis, University of Huddersfield, April 2022)
 Yeo, Geoffrey (1995). Nursing at Barts: A history of nursing service and nurse education at St Bartholomew's Hospital, London. Stroud: Alan Sutton Publishing.

British nurses
1871 births
1951 deaths